Steve Winn (born 6 November 1981) is a Welsh rugby union player. A centre, he has represented Wales A and currently plays his club rugby for the Cornish Pirates having joined from the Welsh regional team Newport Gwent Dragons where he made 29 appearances.

Winn previously played for Bridgend RFC, Swansea RFC and Newport RFC.

References

External links
Newport Gwent Dragons profile

1981 births
Living people
Bridgend RFC players
Cornish Pirates players
Dragons RFC players
Newport RFC players
Swansea RFC players
Welsh rugby union players
Rugby union centres